Manahi may refer to:

Haane Manahi (1913–1986), New Zealand Māori soldier during the Second World War
Manahi Nitama Paewai (1920–1990), also known as Doc Paewai, New Zealand doctor, rugby player, local politician

See also
Faiz Muhammad Manahi Halt railway station, on the now dismantled Tando Adam–Mehrabpur Branch Line in Manahi, Sindh, Pakistan